Woolton pie is a pastry dish of vegetables, widely served in Britain in the Second World War when rationing and shortages made other dishes hard to prepare. It was created at the Savoy Hotel in London by its then Maitre Chef de Cuisine, Francis Latry, and was one of a number of recipes commended to the British public by the Ministry of Food to enable a nutritious diet to be maintained despite shortages and rationing of food, especially meat. It was named after Frederick Marquis, 1st Earl of Woolton (1883–1964), who popularised the recipe after he became Minister of Food in 1940.

Recipe
The recipe involved dicing and cooking potatoes (or parsnips), cauliflower, carrots and possibly turnip. Other vegetables were added where available. Rolled oats and chopped spring onions were added to the thickened vegetable water which was poured over the vegetables themselves. The dish was topped with potato pastry and grated cheese and served with vegetable gravy. The content of the pie filling could easily be altered to include whatever vegetables were in season at the time.

Reception

People realised that meat was in very scarce supply, but that still did not overcome traditions of meat pies. Woolton pie, entirely lacking meat, was not universally well received. An editorial in The Times commented:

Professor John Fuller has noted that Woolton pie and similar wartime austerity dishes "were forgotten as quickly as possible when conditions returned to normal" (one notable exception is carrot cake which, while not invented during the war, was popularised in the United Kingdom then because it used the widely available root vegetable in place of some of the scarce flour, fat and sugar found in other cakes).

Publication

The recipe for Woolton pie has been published on a number of occasions since the war, notably in collections to mark significant anniversaries, e.g. Marguerite Patten's (1985) We'll Eat Again, marking the 40th anniversary of the end of the war in Europe.

See also

 List of foods named after people
 List of pies, tarts and flans
 Rationing in the United Kingdom

References

Citations

Bibliography

Further reading

External links
Woolton Pie (includes original recipe from The Times)

British pies
English cuisine
Potato dishes
Savoury pies
United Kingdom home front during World War II
Brassica dishes